"Sexy, Sexy Lover" is the second single from the Modern Talking eighth album, Alone. The song features rapper Eric Singleton in music video and single.

Track listing 
CD-maxi
 "Sexy Sexy Lover"  (Rap Version) – 3:10
 "Sexy Sexy Lover" (Vocal Version) – 3:33

 "Sexy Sexy Lover" (Extended Rap Version) – 4:59
 "Just Close Your Eyes" – 4:17

CD single
 "Sexy Sexy Lover" (Rap Version) – 3:10
 "Sexy Sexy Lover" (Vocal Version) – 3:33

Chart positions

References

External links

Modern Talking songs
1999 singles
Songs written by Dieter Bohlen
1999 songs
Ariola Records singles